Calothyrza sehestedti is a species of beetle in the family Cerambycidae. It was described by Johan Christian Fabricius in 1798. It is known from Sri Lanka and India.

References

Phrynetini
Beetles described in 1798